Helena Megale Komnene (died 1366) is the name given for the first wife of King Bagrat V of Georgia. Her first name is recorded in The Georgian Chronicles, and her family name is based on a theory which identifies her as a daughter of Basil of Trebizond. If true, the identity of her mother would be uncertain. Basil was bigamous, concurrently married to Irene Palaiologina and Irene of Trebizond.

Helena died in 1366, victim to a plague which had spread across Georgia during the 1350s and 1360s (possibly a recurrence of the Black Death). 

A year after her death, her husband married Anna of Trebizond. 

According to the Georgian Chronicle, Helena was survived by two children:
George VII of Georgia 
David. Otherwise unknown.

References

|-

14th-century births
1366 deaths
Queens consort from Georgia (country)
14th-century deaths from plague (disease)
14th-century people from Georgia (country)
14th-century women from Georgia (country)